Pablo Montes Casanova  (November 23, 1945 in Havana – October 26, 2008) was a Cuban sprinter. His career highlight came in 1968 as he, together with Hermes Ramírez, Juan Morales, and Enrique Figuerola, won an Olympic silver medal in 4 x 100 metres relay. He was also fourth in the 100 m final, just outside the medals. In 1970, he won both the short sprint events (100 metres and 200 metres) at the Central American and Caribbean Games.  In his semi-final for the 100 metres, he clocked a wind-assisted time of 9.93 seconds, then the second fastest time ever, and only the third time that anyone had broken ten seconds.

He died of heart attack in 2008.

Achievements
1971 Central American and Caribbean Championships - bronze medal (200 m)
1971 Central American and Caribbean Championships - bronze medal (100 m)

References

External links
 
 1975 Pan American 4 x 100 metres relay final

1945 births
2008 deaths
Cuban male sprinters
Athletes from Havana
Olympic athletes of Cuba
Olympic silver medalists for Cuba
Olympic silver medalists in athletics (track and field)
Medalists at the 1968 Summer Olympics
Athletes (track and field) at the 1968 Summer Olympics
Athletes (track and field) at the 1972 Summer Olympics
Pan American Games bronze medalists for Cuba
Pan American Games medalists in athletics (track and field)
Athletes (track and field) at the 1967 Pan American Games
Athletes (track and field) at the 1971 Pan American Games
Athletes (track and field) at the 1975 Pan American Games
Central American and Caribbean Games gold medalists for Cuba
Central American and Caribbean Games bronze medalists for Cuba
Competitors at the 1970 Central American and Caribbean Games
Competitors at the 1974 Central American and Caribbean Games
Universiade silver medalists for Cuba
Universiade medalists in athletics (track and field)
Central American and Caribbean Games medalists in athletics
Medalists at the 1970 Summer Universiade
Medalists at the 1967 Pan American Games
Medalists at the 1971 Pan American Games
Medalists at the 1975 Pan American Games